The Nakoma Historic District is located in Madison, Wisconsin. It was added to the National Register of Historic Places in 1998.

History
The land the district is on was once home to a Ho-Chunk village. Contributing buildings in the district were constructed from 1915 to 1946. The Old Spring Tavern is located in the district.

References

Historic districts on the National Register of Historic Places in Wisconsin
National Register of Historic Places in Madison, Wisconsin